Besford railway station served the village of Besford, Worcestershire, England, from 1841 to 1846 on the Birmingham and Gloucester Railway.

History 
The station was opened in November 1841 by the Birmingham and Gloucester Railway. It was listed late in the timetable, appearing on 19 May 1842. It closed in August 1846.

References

External links 

Disused railway stations in Worcestershire
Railway stations in Great Britain opened in 1841
Railway stations in Great Britain closed in 1846
1841 establishments in England
1846 disestablishments in England